Pelican River is the name of several rivers in the United States:

Pelican River (Otter Tail River tributary)
Pelican River (Vermilion River tributary)
Pelican River (Wisconsin River tributary)

See also
Pelican Creek (disambiguation)